Fremont Peak, historically known as Gabilán Peak, is a summit in the Gabilan Range, one of the mountain ranges paralleling California's central coast. The peak affords clear views of the Salinas Valley, Monterey Bay, the southern part of the Santa Clara Valley, and surrounding mountain ranges.

Today the park has camping and picnic facilities,
and is favored by astronomers for its clear views unsullied by artificial light. The Fremont Peak Observatory Association maintains a  diameter f/4.8 Newtonian "Challenger" telescope which was built by  telescope maker Kevin Medlock in the early 1980s.
The peak is also the site of the transmitters for television stations such as KSBW
and KCBA
and for radio stations such as KDON-FM.

History
Previously called Gavilan Peak, it is now named for John C. Frémont, an American explorer and a Captain in the U.S. Army Corps of Topographical Engineers at the time. In 1846, he and a crew of 60 armed surveyors mounted the peak to assess its military value. The peak commands the inland approach from Monterey. As a response to the threat, local Mexican authority General José Castro ordered Frémont and his men to leave California. In defiance, Frémont built a crude stockade and raised a modified American flag above the peak (or, according to some sources, on a lower peak nearby). The U.S. Consul in Monterey, Thomas O. Larkin supported Castro's decision to evict Frémont, and his men were duly ordered out of the area.  Frémont took providence from a windy night which blew down the makeshift flagpole to hasten himself and his men from the peak. The peak is now registered as California Historical Landmark #181.

Following a ride to the summit on March 4, 1906, Frémont Peak Day was inaugurated by local residents. Nineteen years later, the Native Sons of the Golden West installed a commemorative plaque on the summit.

Geology
Fremont Peak lies along the Rocky Ridge fault, and is the largest of many small pendants and septa of pre-Cretaceous metasedimentary rocks in the deeply eroded granitic terrain of the northern Gabilan Range.

References

External links

 
 

Gabilan Range
Mountains of Monterey County, California
Mountains of San Benito County, California
Mountains of Northern California